Petén is a department of Guatemala.  It is geographically the northernmost department of Guatemala, as well as the largest by area at  it accounts for about one third of Guatemala's area.  The capital is Flores. The population at the mid-2018 official estimate was 595,548.

Geography
The Petén department is bordered on the east by Belize and by Mexico (with the Mexican states of Chiapas to the west, Tabasco to the northwest and Campeche to the north). To the south it borders the Guatemalan departments of Alta Verapaz and Izabal. Much of the western border with Mexico is formed by the Usumacinta River and its tributary the Salinas River. Portions of the southern border of the department are formed by the rivers Gracias a Dios and Santa Isabel.

The Petén lowlands are formed by a densely forested low-lying limestone plain featuring karstic topography. The area is crossed by low east-west oriented ridges of Cenozoic limestone and is characterised by a variety of forest and soil types; water sources include generally small rivers and low-lying seasonal swamps known as bajos. A chain of fourteen lakes runs across the central drainage basin of the Petén; during the rainy season some of these lakes become interconnected. The largest lake is Lake Petén Itza, near the centre of the drainage basin; it measures . A broad savannah extends south of the central lakes; it features a compact red clay soil that is too poor to support heavy cultivation. This resulted in a relatively low level of pre-Columbian occupation. The savannah is surrounded by hills with unusually steep southern slopes and gentler northern approaches; the hills are covered with dense tropical forest. To the north of the lakes region bajos become more frequent, interspersed with forest. In the far north of the Petén the Mirador Basin forms another interior drainage region.

The main bodies of standing water in the department are the lakes Petén Itzá, Peténchel, Quexil, Salpetén and Macanche in the centre of the department; Yaxhá and Sacnab in the east, Petexbatún in the southwest, and Perdida, Larga, La Gloria, San Diego, Mendoza, El Repasto and Lacandón in the west.

Climate
The climate of Petén is divided into wet and dry seasons, although these seasons are not clearly defined in the south; the climate varies from tropical in the south to semitropical in the north. Highest temperatures are reached from April to June; January is the coldest month. All Petén experiences a hot dry period in late August.

History
For the early history of the region, see Petén Basin, Maya civilization and Spanish conquest of Petén.

The Petén department was created by decree of the Guatemalan government on 8 May 1866.

Starting in the 1960s the Guatemalan government offered land in Petén to any citizen willing to settle on it and pay a fee of $25. Small airports were built at Flores and Tikal, bringing tourists to the region. In the early 1970s a road was opened from Tikal to Belize. The first paved road in Petén was built in 1982.

Since the 1990s many new settlers have come to Petén. The area is also experiencing severe deforestation in its southern half. Deforestation has been particularly rapid near Laguna del Tigre National Park in western Petén. To combat deforestation, Guatemalan president Álvaro Colom proposed dramatically expanding ecotourism around Maya archaeological sites, especially El Mirador, and trying to further develop an agricultural system in the southern portion of the Maya Biosphere Reserve that would prevent further northward migration. He called his plan "Cuatro Balam".

The Mundo Maya International Airport, in Santa Elena, is the second largest in Guatemala.

Municipalities 

Petén consists of the following 14 municipalities, listed below with their populations in 2002 and 2018. Las Cruces was separated from La Libertad in 2011, and El Chal was separated from Dolores in 2014.

Notes: (a) the 2002 population of El Chal municipality was included in the figure for Dolores municipality. (b) the 2002 population of Las Cruces municipality was included in the figure for La Libertad municipality.

Museums
Museo Regional del Sureste de Petén in Dolores.
 Museo Regional del Mundo Maya, in San Miguel (Flores).

Archaeological sites
The Petén department includes a large number of archaeological sites belonging to the ancient Maya civilization, many of which have only received minimal attention by archaeologists.

Those sites with some level of restoration include: Tikal, Uaxactún, Aguateca, Seibal, Yaxha, Nakum, Topoxte, San Clemente and La Blanca.

Other archaeological sites include: Altar de Sacrificios, La Amelia, Arroyo de Piedra, Bejucal, Cancuén, El Caribe, El Chal, Cival, La Corona, Dos Pilas, Holmul, Holtun, Itzan, Ixkun, Ixlu, Ixtonton, Ixtutz, La Joyanca, Kinal, Machaquila, El Mirador, Motul de San José, La Muerta, Muralla de León, Naachtun, Nakbe, Naranjo, El Peru, Piedras Negras, Polol, El Porvenir, Punta de Chimino, Río Azul, Sacul, San Bartolo, La Sufricaya, Tamarindito, Tayasal, El Tintal, Tres Islas, Ucanal, Xultun, Zacpeten, Zapote Bobal and El Zotz.

Notes

References

External links

 Interactive department map
Map of Petén department from Prensa Libre
Untold Stories, Pulitzer Center on Crisis Reporting
Future of Peten

 
Departments of Guatemala